Hog Island (not to be confused with Hog Island in the Aleutian Archipelago) is an island within the Kodiak Archipelago east of Afognak.

Islands of Alaska
Islands of the Kodiak Archipelago